The 2019 East Staffordshire Borough Council election took place on 2 May 2019 to elect members of the East Staffordshire Borough Council in England. It was held on the same day as other local elections.

Summary

Election result

|-

Ward results

Abbey

Anglesey

Bagots

Branston

Brizlincote

Burton

Churnet

Crown

Eton Park

Heath

Horninglow

Needwood

Rolleston-on-Dove

Shobnall

Stapenhill

Stretton

Town

Tutbury and Outwoods

Weaver

Winshill

Yoxall

By-elections

Eaton Park

Tutbury & Outwoods

References

2019 English local elections
May 2019 events in the United Kingdom
2019
2010s in Staffordshire